Harlem is an album by artist Shawn Amos. Harlem was released on February 15, 2011.

Amos titled the album Harlem after being inspired by a museum exhibit dedicated to the Harlem Renaissance.

Track listing

Players
 Shawn Amos sings, plays acoustic & electric guitars, harmonica, plus banjo on "Vicksburg"
 Patrick Milligan plays banjo, electric & acoustic guitar, and sings
 Ben Peeler plays lap steel, mandolin, and dobro
 Roger Len Smith plays bass and sings
 Robert Jolly plays drums
 Chris Anderson plays piano, plus guitar on "Blackface"
 John Thomas plays organ and piano
 David Henry plays cello and organ
 Gia Ciambotti sings
 Derf Reklaw plays congas on "Blackface"
 Mark Olson sings, plus plays harmonica on "Independence Day"
 Frank "Poncho" Sampedro plays guitar on "Southern Man"
 Jeremy Parzen plays electric guitar on "Angel in Black"
 Charlie George plays snare on "Angel in Black"
 The 3 J's sing on "Vicious Circle"
 Ian Whitcomb arranges brass section on "Goin' East"

Notes

References
Los Angeles Times
National Public Radio

Shawn Amos albums
2011 albums